William Paterson (born 16 September 1902) was a Scottish footballer who played as a goalkeeper for Dunfermline Athletic, Boston Wonder Workers, Dundee United, Arsenal and Airdrieonians.

References

Scottish footballers
Association football goalkeepers
1902 births
Year of death missing
20th-century deaths
Footballers from Dunfermline
Scottish Football League players
Scottish Junior Football Association players
English Football League players
Clydebank F.C. (1914) players
Airdrieonians F.C. (1878) players
Dundee United F.C. players
Arsenal F.C. players
Dunfermline Athletic F.C. players
Boston Soccer Club players
American Soccer League (1921–1933) players
Scottish expatriate sportspeople in the United States
Expatriate soccer players in the United States
Scottish expatriate footballers